Robert Damron (born June 20, 1954) is an American investment banker and politician from the state of Kentucky. Affiliated with the Democratic Party, Damron was a member of the Kentucky House of Representatives from 1993 until 2015, representing the 39th district. He served as the Democratic caucus chair for 4 years.

He announced that he would not seek re-election to the state House in 2014, and would instead run for Jessamine County Judge-Executive, as incumbent William Neal Cassity did not running for re-election. However, Damron would lose this election to Republican David West. Shortly afterwards, he switched parties and became a Republican, saying the national Democratic Party did not represent his values.

References

External links

 
 

Living people
People from Nicholasville, Kentucky
Democratic Party members of the Kentucky House of Representatives
University of Kentucky alumni
1954 births
Place of birth missing (living people)